Seville is a village in Medina County, Ohio, United States. The population was 2,296 at the 2010 census.

History
Seville was platted in 1828. It was named after Seville, in Spain.

A post office was established in Seville in 1830.

Geography
Seville is located at  (41.015620, -81.864363).

Demographics

2010 census
As of the census of 2010, there were 2,296 people, 917 households, and 634 families living in the village. The racial makeup of the village was 96.9% White, 0.7% African American, 0.2% Native American, 0.5% Asian, 0.4% from other races, and 1.3% from two or more races. Hispanic or Latino of any race were 1.5% of the population.

There were 917 households, of which 30.0% had children under the age of 18 living with them, 53.5% were married couples living together, 10.7% had a female householder with no husband present, 4.9% had a male householder with no wife present, and 30.9% were non-families. 26.2% of all households were made up of individuals, and 9.8% had someone living alone who was 65 years of age or older. The average household size was 2.40 and the average family size was 2.87.

The median age in the village was 41.8 years. 20.9% of residents were under the age of 18; 7.6% were between the ages of 18 and 24; 26.3% were from 25 to 44; 29.1% were from 45 to 64; and 16.1% were 65 years of age or older. The gender makeup of the village was 47.9% male and 52.1% female.

2000 census
As of the census of 2000, there were 2,160 people, 808 households, and 611 families living in the village. The population density was 1,070.9 people per square mile (412.9/km). There were 847 housing units at an average density of 419.9 per square mile (161.9/km). The racial makeup of the village was 98.5% White, 0.19% African American, 0.86% Native American, 0.86% Asian, 0.05% from other races, and 0.19% from two or more races. Hispanic or Latino of any race were 0.65% of the population.

There were 808 households, out of which 36.1% had children under the age of 18 living with them, 64.7% were married couples living together, 8.2% had a female householder with no husband present, and 24.3% were non-families. 20.9% of all households were made up of individuals, and 8.5% had someone living alone who was 65 years of age or older. The average household size was 2.58 and the average family size was 2.97.

In the village, the population was spread out, with 25.5% under the age of 18, 6.0% from 18 to 24, 31.9% from 25 to 44, 22.6% from 45 to 64, and 14.0% who were 65 years of age or older. The median age was 37 years. For every 100 females there were 89.0 males. For every 100 females age 18 and over, there were 84.0 males.

The median income for a household in the village was $47,935, and the median income for a family was $54,844. Males had a median income of $41,339 versus $25,000 for females. The per capita income for the village was $22,644. About 2.4% of families and 3.7% of the population were below the poverty line, including 3.3% of those under age 18 and 5.3% of those age 65 or over.

Education
Seville has a public library, a branch of Medina County District Library.

Ohio Western Reserve National Cemetery
The Ohio Western Reserve National Cemetery, opened in 2000, is within city limits.

In the media
Opera North, based in Leeds, England, set its January 2011 production of Georges Bizet's opera Carmen in Seville, Ohio, rather than Seville, Spain.

Notable people
 Martin and Anna Bates – sideshow performers, world's tallest married couple
 John H. Hoover – United States Admiral
 C.V. Matteson – American baseball pitcher and former mayor.
Molly Webster – journalist; Senior Correspondent for WNYC's RadioLab; actor (2021 film C'mon C'mon)
 Lionel Dahmer – father of serial killer Jeffrey Dahmer

References

External links
 The Medina County Community Advocate

Villages in Medina County, Ohio
Villages in Ohio
Populated places established in 1828